Sheldon is an unincorporated community and census-designated place (CDP) in Beaufort County, South Carolina, United States. It was first listed as a CDP in the 2020 census with a population of 579.

A rural area in character, Sheldon was primarily a common gathering area for various plantation owners and slaves prior to the Civil War. It is renowned for the Old Sheldon Church Ruins. Several hunt clubs and gated communities are located in the area.

The Pocosobo Town was listed on the National Register of Historic Places in 1994.

Geography
It is located at latitude 32.602 and longitude –80.793. Sheldon is located approximately halfway between Beaufort and Yemassee and just east of Interstate 95 in the heart of the Lowcountry region.  U.S. Routes 17 and 21 run through the center of the community in a wrong-way concurrency.

Demographics

2020 census

References

Census-designated places in South Carolina
Census-designated places in Beaufort County, South Carolina
Unincorporated communities in South Carolina
Unincorporated communities in Beaufort County, South Carolina